The Isle of Wight gasification facility is a municipal waste treatment plant in southern England. It entered the commissioning phase in autumn 2008, and will be replaced by a new moving grate incinerator in 2019

The facility has been funded as part of Defra's New Technologies Demonstrator Programme and is one of the first and only facilities in the United Kingdom to be classed as a gasification system employed for the combustion of refuse derived fuel originating from municipal waste. The plant is operated by Waste Gas Technology UK Ltd, part of the ENER·G group, and utilises the Energos technology; Energos is also part of the ENER·G group. The Energos system was retrofitted into a small conventional incinerator plant and combust an estimated 30,000 tonnes of refuse-derived fuel per year. Originally estimated at £8 million, the retrofit cost £10 million to commission, £2.7 million of which was funded by DEFRA.

The plant is sited at Forest Road, Newport.

Temporary suspension of operation, 2010
Due to increased dioxin emission levels detected in March 2010 exceeding 8 times the legal limit, operation was temporarily suspended spring 2010. The flue gas cleaning system of the old incinerator was reused in the retrofit, and ENER·G reported this system to be the cause of the problem. Following modifications and several startup attempts, it has been operating again since October 2010.

In June 2011, the Isle of Wight council decided to make radical efforts to lessen its dependence on the gasification facility with reference to its history of limited reliability. In 2017 it was decided to build a new grate based incinerator to replace the Energos plant by 2019.

Energos technology
The Energos system includes a close coupled combustion stage which, as configured, uses all the syngas in the combustion stage. It is thus not able to produce syngas for external use and therefore sometimes categorized as two-stage combustion. The process enables improved control of the combustion to minimise the formation of combustion related emissions such as oxides of nitrogen (NOx), Carbon Monoxide (CO) and Total Organic Carbons (TOC). Operating plants achieve average annual NOx emissions of 25 – 30% of the EU limit using just process control and without the need for either Selective Non Catalytic Reduction (SNCR) or Selective Catalytic Reduction (SCR), whilst at the same time achieving very low CO and TOC emissions.

The energy in the combusted syngas is converted into steam. Energos plants produce steam at lower temperature and pressure than modern waste incinerators, and thus achieve low energy-efficiencies compared to incinerators. As a CHP or heat delivery plant, the cycle efficiency is approaching 85%. One such example is the recently constructed Sarpsborg 2 plant, which provides process steam to the Borregaard Chemical Plant, directly displacing heavy fuel oil.

The Isle of Wight plant debuts a new furnace design for the Energos process aimed at increased combustion efficiency, dust removal and enabling less interruptions and downtime than the earlier design

See also

 Incineration
 Gasification
 Gasifier
 Pyrolysis
 Thermal treatment

References

Bioenergy in the United Kingdom
Buildings and structures on the Isle of Wight
Thermal treatment
Waste power stations in England